Copper Basin may refer to:

Copper Basin (Tennessee)
Copper Basin (Nevada)
Copper Basin Railway, Arizona
Copper Basin High School, Copperhill, Tennessee